Ross Andrew McGinnis (June 14, 1987 – December 4, 2006) was a United States Army soldier who was posthumously awarded the United States' highest decoration for bravery, the Medal of Honor, for his actions during the Iraq War.

While serving as the gunner in a HMMWV, his convoy was attacked and a hand grenade was thrown into his vehicle. McGinnis was killed in action when he deliberately threw himself on the grenade, saving the lives of at least four other soldiers in the vehicle. He was the fourth service member to receive the Medal of Honor during the Iraq War, which was presented to his family following his death.

Early life and education
McGinnis was born in Meadville, Pennsylvania, on June 14, 1987, to Romayne and Tom McGinnis and grew up in Knox, 90 miles north of Pittsburgh, after his family moved there when he was three. When he was in kindergarten, his teacher gave him a paper that at the top said "When I grow up, I want to be __" and he wrote "an Army Man". When he was growing up he became involved in the Boy Scouts of America, enjoyed working on cars, and was an athlete playing multiple sports. He played basketball and soccer through the YMCA, and Little League baseball. He attended Clarion County public schools and graduated from Keystone Junior/Senior High School in 2005. He had two sisters, Becky and Katie.

Military career
McGinnis had wanted to be a soldier since kindergarten and joined the United States Army through the Delayed Entry Program on his 17th birthday, on June 14, 2004. Following basic training at Fort Benning, Georgia, he was assigned to the 1st Battalion, 26th Infantry Regiment, in Ledward Barracks, Schweinfurt, Germany.

In August 2006, aged 19, the regiment was deployed to eastern Baghdad and he was serving as a .50 caliber machine-gunner in a HMMWV during operations against insurgents in Adhamiyah. On December 4, while his platoon was on mounted patrol in Adhamiyah, a grenade was thrown into his vehicle. He shouted a warning to the other four men in the vehicle, so they could prepare for the blast. When one of the men responded they could not see where the device had landed, instead of jumping out of the gunner's hatch, McGinnis threw his back over the grenade, absorbing the bulk of the blast. He was killed instantly, but the other occupants suffered only minor injuries.

McGinnis is buried at Arlington National Cemetery in Virginia. Since the beginning of the Iraq War, he is one of five known United States servicemembers who have thrown themselves on a live grenade. The other personnel known to have done this are Marine Corporal Jason Dunham, Navy SEAL Petty Officer 2nd Class Michael A. Monsoor, Marine Corporal Kyle Carpenter, and Marine Sergeant Rafael Peralta. McGinnis was the fourth recipient of the Medal of Honor in the course of the Iraq War.

A ceremony was held in the east room of the White House on June 2, 2008, in which the medal was presented to his family by President George W. Bush. In addition to his family and the President, many other notable people attended the ceremony, including the Vice President, the Secretary of Veterans Affairs James Peake, Secretary of the Army Pete Geren, Secretary of the Air Force Michael Wynne, General Jim "Hoss" Cartwright, and the Vice Chairman of the Joint Chiefs. Several members of Congress also attended as did members of McGinnis' unit from Iraq, including the other soldiers from the vehicle he sacrificed his life to save.

Awards and decorations
In addition to the Medal of Honor he also received a posthumous promotion to specialist as well as the Bronze Star Medal and the Purple Heart.

Medal of Honor citation

For conspicuous gallantry and intrepidity at the risk of his life above and beyond the call of duty:

Other honors
A PBS Special Report chronicled the life of McGinnis as told by his parents, friends and the people of his hometown of Knox, Clarion County, Pennsylvania.

See also

List of Medal of Honor recipients

Notes

External links

Sports Illustrated editorial on McGinnis
United States Army profile

1987 births
2006 deaths
Deaths by hand grenade
United States Army Medal of Honor recipients
American military personnel killed in the Iraq War
United States Army soldiers
People from Clarion County, Pennsylvania
Burials at Arlington National Cemetery
Iraq War recipients of the Medal of Honor
People from Meadville, Pennsylvania
United States Army personnel of the Iraq War